Anastasiya Mykolayivna Shoshyna (born 30 November 1997) is an inactive Ukrainian professional tennis player who is playing for Poland since 2020.

Shoshyna has won five singles and ten doubles titles on the ITF Circuit. She has career-high WTA rankings of 381 in singles and 279 in doubles, reached on 19 August 2019 and 2 March 2020, respectively.

Shoshyna made her WTA Tour singles main-draw debut at the 2016 Katowice Open, after receiving a wildcard for the tournament.

In December 2020, Shoshyna was provisionally suspended under Article 8.3.1(c) of the 2020 Tennis Anti-Doping Programme. She had failed a drug test; a urine sample she had provided at the $25k Ted Republican girls' tournament, played in Istanbul, Turkey from 26 October to 1 November 2020, was found to contain the prohibited substance stanozolol.

ITF Circuit finals

Singles: 8 (5 titles, 3 runner–ups)

Doubles: 16 (10 titles, 6 runner–ups)

References

External links
 
 
 

1997 births
Living people
Ukrainian female tennis players
Polish female tennis players
Polish people of Ukrainian descent
Ukrainian emigrants to Poland
Doping cases in tennis
Naturalized citizens of Poland
Sportspeople from Kharkiv